At least two ships of the Spanish Navy have borne the name Tornado:

 
 

Spanish Navy ship names